Amit Kumar has sung 760 songs in Hindi films. The following is a complete list of songs recorded by him:

Film songs

1970s

1980s

1990s

2000s and onwards

Regional songs

Marathi songs

Odia songs

Bengali songs

See also
List of songs recorded by Kishore Kumar
List of songs recorded by Udit Narayan
Bollywood selected discography of Udit Narayan
Abhijeet Bhattacharya Discography
Sonu Nigam discography
List of songs recorded by Alka Yagnik
List of songs recorded by Mohammed Rafi (T)
List of songs recorded by Anuradha Paudwal

References

Lists of songs recorded by Indian singers